Northwestern University has had 22 different presidents throughout 25 presidential terms (including 8 interim/acting presidential terms) since it was founded in 1851.

List of presidents
Clark T. Hinman, DD (1853–1854)
Henry S. Noyes, MA (1854–1856) (interim/acting president)
Randolph S. Foster, DD, LLD (1856–1860)
Henry S. Noyes, MA (1860–1867) (interim/acting president)
David H. Wheeler, DD (1867–1869) (interim/acting president)
Erastus O. Haven, DD, LLD (1869–1872)
Charles H. Fowler, DD, LLD (1872–1876)
Oliver Marcy, LLD (1876–1881) (interim/acting president)
Joseph Cummings, DD, LLD (1881–1890)
Oliver Marcy, LLD (1890–1890) (interim/acting president)
Henry Wade Rogers, LLD (1890–1900)
Daniel Bonbright, MA, LLD (1900–1902) (interim/acting president)
Edmund J. James, PhD, LLD (1902–1904)
Thomas F. Holgate, PhD, LLD (1904–1906) (interim/acting president)
Abram W. Harris, ScD, LLD (1906–1916)
Thomas F. Holgate, PhD, LLD (1916–1919) (interim/acting president)
Lynn H. Hough, DD (1919–1920)
Walter Dill Scott, PhD, LLD (1920–1939)
Franklyn Bliss Snyder, PhD, LLD (1939–1949)
J. Roscoe Miller, MD, LLD, ScD (1949–1970)
Robert H. Strotz, PhD, LLD (1970–1984)
Arnold R. Weber, PhD (1984–1994)
Henry S. Bienen, PhD (1995–2009)
Morton O. Schapiro, PhD (2009–2022)
Michael H. Schill, J.D. (2022–present)

References

 
Northwestern
Northwestern
Northwestern University presidents